Robert Veel (died c. 1432), of Shepton Beauchamp, Somerset and Mappowder and Frome Whitfield, Dorset, was an English politician.

He was a Member (MP) of the Parliament of England for Melcombe Regis in 1393 and 1394 and for Dorchester in January 1397.

References

14th-century births
1432 deaths
English MPs 1393
People from Somerset
Members of the Parliament of England for Dorchester
English MPs 1394
English MPs January 1397